Perundurai is a state assembly constituency in Erode district in Tamil Nadu. Its State Assembly Constituency number is 103. It covers Perundurai and some parts of Erode City. It is included in Erode Parliamentary Constituency. The constituency is in existence since 1957 election. It is one of the 234 State Legislative Assembly Constituencies in Tamil Nadu, in India.

Elections and winners in the constituency are listed below.

Demographics
Kongu Vellalar Gounder Community majorly presented in this assembly constituency Senguntha Mudaliar, Vettuva Gounder and Adi Dravida communities are populated in this constituency.

Tamil Nadu

Election results

2021

2016

2011

2006

2001

1996

1991

1989

1984

1980

1977

1971

1967

1962

1957

References 

 

Assembly constituencies of Tamil Nadu
Erode district